St. John the Baptist Church is an abandoned and ruined church presently located within the SEEPZ Industrial Area, in Andheri, Mumbai, India. It was built by the Portuguese Jesuits in 1579 and opened to public worship on the feast of John the Baptist that year. It also had an attached graveyard. The church was abandoned in 1840 after an epidemic hit the village. Fr. José Lourenço Pais, the then Vicar of Kondivita transferred the church to the nearby Marol village. The baptismal font, pillars and altars were transferred to the new church.

After abandonment, the church fell into decay and vegetation started to take over the ruins. Despite being abandoned, the native Christians visit the church once every year, as is traditional worldwide.

The church was handed back to Fr. Rodney Esperance of Bombay Archdiocese in 2003 by the then Maharashtra Chief Minister Sushil Kumar Shinde.

References

 Roofless, but soul is intact, Jeetha D'Silva, Times of India, pg-5, 2005-07-10
 

Roman Catholic churches in Mumbai
Religious buildings and structures completed in 1579
Portuguese structures in Mumbai
Church ruins in India
Jesuit churches in India